Uways or Uwais may refer to:

People

 Uwais al-Qarni (594–657 CE), a Yemenite from the time of Muhammad, classified by Muslims as a Ṭābi‘
 Shaikh Uvais, Jalayirid ruler (1356–1374)
 Uvais II, Jalayirid ruler (1415–1421)
 Uwais Khan, Moghul Khan of Mughalistan 1418–1421 CE and 1425–1429 CE
 Esen Buqa II (died 1462), Khan of Moghulistan
 Üveys Pasha (1512–1547)
 Uways Al-Barawi (b. 1847–1909), a Somali scholar
 Mohammed Uwais  (born 1936), Chief Justice of the Supreme Court of Nigeria

Religious movements
 Uwaisi, a Sufi religious movement named for Uwais al-Qarni
 Naqshbandia Owaisiah, an Uwaisi order